The Samsung Galaxy Core 2 is a smartphone manufactured by Samsung Electronics. It was first unveiled by Samsung in July 2014  on the official website and was released the following month. It is the successor to the Samsung Galaxy Core. It runs on Android 4.4.2 KitKat. It has a 4.5 inch capacitive touchscreen with WVGA (480x800) resolution, with a pixel density of 207 ppi. It has a Quad-core processor clocked at 1.2 GHz. It has 768 MB of RAM. The Galaxy Core 2 has 4GB of internal storage and supports MicroSD cards up to 64GB.

It has a 5MP primary camera with autofocus and an LED flash. It has a 0.3MP (VGA) front facing camera. It can record 480p video at 30fps. Other features include Touch to focus, Continuous shot and Geo tagging.

The device features an accelerometer intended to translate natural gestures into commands.

It has a 2000 mAh Li-ion battery with a talk time of up to 7 hours and music playback of up to 30 hours.

See also
Samsung Galaxy Core
Samsung Galaxy Core Prime

References
 Samsung Galaxy Core II - Full phone specifications
 Samsung Galaxy Core 2 specs

External links
 
 Samsung Galaxy Core 2 specs
 Samsung Galaxy Core II - Full phone specifications

Android (operating system) devices
Samsung smartphones
Galaxy Core II
Mobile phones introduced in 2014